Baburik-e Sofla (also Romanized as Bābūrīk-e Soflá; also known as Bābūrīk-e Pā’īn, Babrīk-e Pā’īn, and Kalāteh-ye Yā‘qūb) is a village in Qohestan Rural District, Qohestan District, Darmian County, South Khorasan Province, Iran. At the 2006 census, its population was 72, in 19 families.

References 

Populated places in Darmian County